Alejandro Cano Ricaud (born 4 December 1963) is a Mexican politician from the Institutional Revolutionary Party. From 2009 to 2012 he served as Deputy of the LXI Legislature of the Mexican Congress representing Chihuahua.

References

1963 births
Living people
People from Chihuahua City
Institutional Revolutionary Party politicians
21st-century Mexican politicians
Municipal presidents of Chihuahua
Deputies of the LXI Legislature of Mexico
Members of the Chamber of Deputies (Mexico) for Chihuahua (state)